Central station is an Edmonton Light Rail Transit station in Edmonton, Alberta, Canada. It serves both the Capital Line and the Metro Line. It is an underground station located beneath Jasper Avenue between 100 Street and 101 Street.

History
Central LRT Station was one of the original five stations when the line opened on April 22, 1978. When the LRT first opened, Central station was the original southern terminus.

ETS once operated a Transit Information kiosk at 100A Street and Jasper Avenue, above the station; however, it has since been relocated to the Edmonton Tower. The building now serves as an entrance for users requiring an elevator to get to the station platform.

The concourse level of the station was renovated in 2013, which included the complete replacement of ceilings, washrooms and signage.

Station layout
The station has a  centre loading platform that can accommodate two five-car LRT trains at the same time, with one train on each side of the platform.  At just under , the platform is narrow by current Edmonton LRT design guidelines.  Access to the platform is from the concourse level by stairs and escalators located at each end of the platform.  The concourse level is part of the Edmonton pedway system.

There is direct underground access to ATB Place, Scotia Place and Commerce Place from the station at the concourse level.

The station includes a mural installed to celebrate the twentieth anniversary of Edmonton's LRT system.

Around the station
Commerce Place
Downtown
Edmonton House
Enbridge Centre
Hotel Macdonald
Manulife Place
McLeod Building
Scotia Place
ATB Place

References

Edmonton Light Rail Transit stations
Railway stations in Canada opened in 1978
Capital Line
Metro Line